Davide Di Pasquale (born 27 January 1996) is an Italian professional footballer who plays as a centre back for  club Foggia.

Career
Born in Pescara, Di Pasquale started his career on local club Delfino Pescara. As a senior, he was loaned to Serie D clubs Giulianova and Campobasso.

On 29 July 2016, he left Pescara and signed with Serie C club Sambenedettese. In February 2019, he extended his contract still 2021. Di Pasquale played five Serie C seaons for the club.

On 31 August 2021, he moved to Foggia.

References

External links
 
 

1996 births
Living people
Sportspeople from Pescara
Footballers from Abruzzo
Italian footballers
Association football forwards
Serie C players
Serie D players
Delfino Pescara 1936 players
Giulianova Calcio players
S.S.D. Città di Campobasso players
A.S. Sambenedettese players
Calcio Foggia 1920 players